Sint-Maria-Lierde is a village which makes up part of the municipality of Lierde. It is located in the Denderstreek and in the Flemish Ardennes, the hilly southern part of the Belgian province of East Flanders.

Overview
The village was first mentioned as Lirda Sancte Marie in the late 12th century. Sint-Maria-Lierde was a small agricultural village situated in the north-east of the municipality. In 1840, a road nowadays known as N8 was constructed to the south. In 1867, the railway line Ghent–Geraardsbergen was constructed with a train station near the intersection with the road. The area around the train station started to develop, and was named Lierde after the station. In the 20th century, the village became mainly residential with a large proportion of commuters.

In 1977, the municipalities Deftinge, Hemelveerdegem, Sint-Maria-Lierde and Sint-Martens-Lierde were merged into Lierde.

The village's coat of arms shows a heart of Jesus beneath a crown. The arms were granted in 1818 and confirmed on 20 December 1840.

References

Gallery

External links 
 

Lierde
Populated places in East Flanders
Former municipalities of East Flanders